Lisa Pennington (born 20 February 1963) is a British former professional tennis player.

Pennington, who was raised in Lutterworth, took up a scholarship to Mississippi State University and as a freshman in 1982 was selected to participate in the NCAA singles championships.

Following her stint in collegiate tennis she competed on the professional tour and reached a career high singles ranking of 229 in the world. She made the second round of the 1986 Brazilian Open and 1987 Argentine Open.

References

External links
 
 

1963 births
Living people
British female tennis players
People from Lutterworth
Tennis people from Leicestershire
Mississippi State Bulldogs athletes
College women's tennis players in the United States
English female tennis players